Atuat Akkitirq is a Canadian filmmaker, actress and costume designer. A partner in the filmmaking collective Arnait Video Productions, she was a shortlisted Genie Award nominee for Best Costume Design at the 22nd Genie Awards in 2002 for Atanarjuat: The Fast Runner, and won the award at the 30th Genie Awards in 2010 for Before Tomorrow (Le Jour avant le lendemain).

She also had supporting roles as an actress in both Atanarjuat and The Journals of Knud Rasmussen, and was a co-director with Marie-Hélène Cousineau, Madeline Ivalu, Susan Avingaq and Carol Kunuk of Arnait's 2001 documentary film Anaana. She has also taught management studies at Nunavut Arctic College.

References

External links

Canadian costume designers
Inuit artists
Inuit actresses
Indigenous fashion designers of the Americas
Artists from Nunavut
Actresses from Nunavut
Canadian film actresses
Best Costume Design Genie and Canadian Screen Award winners
Canadian women artists
Living people
Year of birth missing (living people)
Place of birth missing (living people)
Canadian Inuit women
Inuit from the Northwest Territories
Inuit from Nunavut
Film directors from Nunavut
People from Igloolik
Women costume designers
Canadian women film directors